The 2016 PBA-D-League Foundation Cup is the second conference of the 2015-16 PBA Developmental League season. Seven (7) teams including new team Blustar Detergent Dragons composed of the Westports Malaysia Dragons players will be compete in the two-month conference that will start on June 2, 2016, at the Ynares Sports Arena, Pasig. The games will be aired on AksyonTV, Hyper and Sports5.ph.

Teams

Format
Conference format as it follows:

All seven teams will play in a double round-robin elimination phase. 
Top 4 teams of the elimination round will advanced in the semifinals round.
In case of ties in the elimination round standings, it will be broken via the quotient system.
Top 2 teams will get a twice-to-beat semifinals incentives.
The two teams who won the semifinals matches will battle in a best-of-3 finals series.

Eliminations
Eliminations matches will be held at the Ynares Sports Arena, Pasig and the JCSGO Gym, Quezon City. The league also had an out-of-town game held on June 23, 2016, at the Strike Gym, Bacoor, Cavite.

Standings 
These are the team standings at the end of the elimination round:

Schedule

Results

Playoffs

Semifinals

Racal vs. Tanduay series

Phoenix vs. Cafefrance series

References

PBA D-League Foundation Cup
2015–16 in Philippine basketball